Crenigomphus is a genus of dragonfly in the family Gomphidae. It contains the following species:
 Crenigomphus abyssinicus
 Crenigomphus denticulatus
 Crenigomphus hartmanni
 Crenigomphus renei

References 

Gomphidae
Taxonomy articles created by Polbot